The Co-operative Permanent Building Society was a mutual building society, providing mortgages and savings accounts to its members. Its head office was located at New Oxford House in London. In 1970, it was renamed the Nationwide Building Society.

History

Origins 1884 - 1900

The Southern Co-operative Permanent Building Society was formed in 1884 by a group of Co-operators including Thomas Webb and Charles Cooper, initially to provide a service to members of the co-operative movement, enabling them to own their own properties. The early rules of the Society show that each member of the Society had one vote on resolutions at the Annual General Meeting, and that a member of the Society could be either a man or a woman. (At this time women were unable to vote in parliamentary elections)

Some of the Society’s first mortgages went to local co-operative societies to buy their own buildings. Mortgage Number 3, granted in June 1884, was given to the Hampton Co-operative Society to buy land worth £100. Mortgage number 10, granted in April 1885, went to the Ardsley Co-operative Society to buy a shop and bake house for £350. The first domestic mortgage was to Alfred Idle for a house in Morrison Street, Battersea – the mortgage was for £120.

Thomas Webb opened the first savings account for £10. Charles Copper opened the next savings account for £1. Savings account number 21 belonged to the first female saver, opened in March 1884 with 9 shillings. The account holder was Miss Catherine Webb, the daughter of Thomas Webb. By the end of the first year in business, there were 217 savings accounts, ranging from £150 to sixpence.

In 1892 the Southern Co-operative Permanent Building Society enlisted Arthur Webb, son of Thomas Webb, as secretary to replace Charles Cooper. Arthur’s arrival proved to be a turning point for the Society. In 1894 Arthur insisted on the removal of ‘Southern’ from the Society’s name. He had worked hard to build a national network of agents for the Society and thought the name should represent this enlarged coverage.

Housing and savings 1901 – 1913

In 1903 the Society moved headquarters to much bigger premises at 22 Red Lion Square. This was to remain its head office for the next twenty-five years.

The Society agreed on 29 July 1904 to lend £2200 for builders to create the first garden city in Letchworth (Founded by Sir Ebenezer Howard and planned by Barry Parker and Raymond Unwin). Members of the board at the time also visited the site to inspect the work done, as they wanted to check on the quality of the housing being built. The Society also sponsored the ‘Cheap Cottage’ competition in 1905 to find the best quality cottage that could be built for £150 or less.

The Society also acted to encourage savings amongst its members. In 1904 they introduced savings boxes that were available to members for a small deposit and created the Home Savings Bank department to manage this new product. Interest was offered on the accounts at 3 and 1/3% or 1d for every 10 shillings per quarter. This kind of account especially appealed to children, and the first child recorded as opening such an account was Thomas John Mansbridge, son of Albert Mansbridge. Mansbridge himself had joined the Society in 1901 as a cashier, before joining the board and then becoming a director, serving 5 years as president in 1942 - 1947.

World War 1 and the Society’s growth 1914 – 1938

Between 1914 and 1918, the Society was inevitably affected by disruption in its workforce. Many of its agents joined the Forces and substitutions had to be found – sometimes these were the wives, sisters and daughters of the original agents.

At the early stages in the war, the Society moved to seek insurance through Lloyds to protect all mortgage properties against loss or damage caused by aircraft or bombardment.

After the war, with the need for new developments and homes the Society increased its assets from under £500,000 to over £2m by 1924. The Society’s growth meant they needed to move out of 22 Red Lion Square. In 1925 the Society’s architect drew up plans for a new headquarters, New Oxford House, in London which opened in 1926.

The growth of the economy improved throughout later 1930s, with an average of 350,000 new homes being built every year and the Society continued to prosper in this housing boom. In the year before the Second World War, the Co-operative Permanent had increased its assets to over £30m and its branch network to 32 branches.

World War 2 and links with Co-operative movement 1939 – 1945

The Society prepared for the outbreak of war by purchasing Chiltern House, just outside High Wycombe in 1938 to move many head office functions out of London. (New Oxford House at that time supported the war effort as a clothing coupon centre) By early 1941, there were so many properties affected by bombing that the Society set up a War Damage Section to deal with all the administration and enquiries. The section dealt with the government on the members’ behalf to claim compensation for repairs. During the war the Society allowed members to reduce payments to interest only because of war damage and wherever possible survey fees for damaged properties were waived in hardship cases. From 1942 onwards the Society tried to influence the mortgage rate to ease the burden on homeowners, it cut its own rate by 0.5% to 5% in 1942 and cut again down to 4% in 1943.

The Society also kept a keen eye on the building society sector, and realising that some smaller societies were struggling to stay afloat they began a campaign of contacting these societies with suggestions for amalgamation This was a controversial tactic and not universally welcomed, with some of the Society’s tors unhappy about the strategy. However, it did result in opportunities for growth and several smaller societies joined forces with the Society during these years - the peak came in 1944 when 10 societies transferred their engagements to the Co-operative Permanent.

In 1944 the Society’s then president, Harry Score, wanted to bring the society closer to the Co-operative movement, by giving representatives of the Co-operative Wholesale Societies seats on the Society’s board. The president had a vision that members would get a ‘total package’ with a mortgage through the Society and household fittings/ furniture through the Wholesale Societies.

Post-war support and branch network growth 1946 – 1959

After the war, the Society supported ‘Self-Build’ groups, giving them the financial support, they needed to rebuild or build new homes. The Society’s ambitions for growth were thwarted at this time due to the emphasis by the post-war government on public sector housing.

In 1948 the Society introduced the first edition of their staff magazine, ‘The Pyramid’. The Society created this magazine due to their branch network expansion and the need to maintain close co-ordination between staff.

In 1950 the Society reported great expansion with over 100 branches and double the amount of surplus profit compared to 1941 (1941 £1,360,253 – 1950 £2,934,748). The appointment of Herbert Ashworth as chief executive paved the way for more growth with his fresh energy, enthusiasm and vision to grow the branch network. The Society also benefitted from a new government which was enthusiastic about encouraging home ownership and supported a large house building programme.

Leaving the Co-operative Union and change of name 1960 – 1970

1962 saw the construction of a new head office in London – this time an 11-storey building in High Holborn. This was again called New Oxford House with the previous head office now being renamed Chesterfield House, it was opened by the Duke of Hamilton and Brandon.

In 1965 the Society agreed not to continue the arrangements Harry Score had put in place with representatives from Co-operative societies being on their board. It was thought that such a close association with the Co-operative Movement might be hindering their growth and narrowing their appeal to potential members.

In the late 1960s, the Society began a process of computerisation of its branch accounting. A central accounting system established at Chesterfield House, enabled branches to use computer-style account numbers for all new business.

In 1970 after a period of internal research and debate, the Society agreed to leave the Co-operative Union and change its name to Nationwide Building Society. This decision was confirmed by a vote of members on 16 September 1970.

Transfers of engagements

Arms

See also

British co-operative movement
History of the cooperative movement
Arthur Webb (co-operator)
Albert Mansbridge, Brick upon Brick  Co-operative Permanent Building Society 1884-1934, 1934, London

References

Companies based in the London Borough of Camden
Banks established in 1884
Banks disestablished in 1970
Financial services companies based in London
Former co-operatives of the United Kingdom
History of the London Borough of Camden
1884 establishments in the United Kingdom